Nashua is a neighborhood on the northside Kansas City, Missouri, United States in what is known as the Northland.

A post office called Nashua was established in 1890, and remained in operation until 1962. The community was named after Nashua, New Hampshire, the native home of an early settler.

References

Neighborhoods in Kansas City, Missouri